Xorides fuligator is a parasitoid wasp from Ichneumonid family that parasitizes long-horned beetle of subspecies Arhopalus rusticus rusticus.

References

Xoridinae
Insects described in 1822